Thomas Cushman may refer to:

 Thomas Cushman (Plymouth colonist) (1607/08–1691), leader in Plymouth Colony, New England
 Thomas Cushman (sociologist), American sociologist